KMXN (92.9 FM) is a radio station that broadcasts in a country music format. The radio station is licensed to Osage City, Kansas, and the station serves the Topeka and Lawrence areas. The station is currently owned by Great Plains Media and broadcasts in HD Radio.

History

1981-1995: Country 
Originally, the station served Emporia at 92.7 FM, with a transmitter located north of the city near Admire. The earliest call letters are KZOC, first assigned in 1981. The station went on the air in late 1982. The format was country music using the name "KZ93." The station eventually moved to 92.9 FM and upgraded power to 36,000 watts in 1989.

1995-2003: Oldies 
In 1995, the station flipped to oldies. The station changed call letters to KANS-FM on April 1. The oldies format was satellite-fed. Owner C&C Consulting downgraded the transmitter to 7,900 watts in 2000.

2003-2005: Rhythmic Top 40 
After a sale to 3 Point Communications in July 2003, the station relocated its transmitter to a location between Scranton and Carbondale; the purpose of this was to target Topeka. Along with the transmitter re-location, the station began stunting with a continuous loop of Tone Loc's "Wild Thing." On August 11, 2003, "Wild 92-9", Topeka's Hottest Jams, made its debut with a Rhythmic CHR format. On August 18, 2003, KANS-FM changed call letters to KKYD, with the KANS call letters being moved to KRWV (then located at 99.5 FM, now at 96.1 FM) in Emporia. The station was an affiliate for the Portland, Oregon-based morning show "The Playhouse" and "Pocos Pero Locos", a Hispanic-targeting hip hop show. Despite the new owners using the same playlist for several months, the station actually did well in the ratings, though advertising revenues were low.

2005-2006: Adult Hits 
Using the name Viking Media, and later becoming Great Plains Media, Jerome Zimmer bought the station in early 2005. Zimmer reportedly didn't want to be involved with an Urban-related format, so around the time KLZR flipped from Top 40 to Hot AC, KKYD pulled the plug on its Rhythmic format on July 18, 2005. After three days of stunting with a mix of children's music, polkas, and bagpipe tunes, KKYD flipped at Midnight on July 21 to adult hits, branded as "92-9 Max FM." KKYD changed call letters to KMXN on August 9. Throughout its tenure as "Max", the station had no on air DJs. Great Plains Media upgraded the wattage to 42,000 watts, moving the transmitter again, this time near Overbrook.

2006-2009: Rock 
On February 21, 2006, KMXN flipped to classic rock, branded as "X 92.9." This was done to compete more directly against KDVV and KWIC. KMXN added live air talent, plus the syndicated Bob & Tom show. During this time, KMXN started to carry Lawrence Free State High School sports.

On January 18, 2007, "X" transitioned from classic rock to a more current-based active rock format. The station began targeting Lawrence during this time period. KMXN kept "Bob & Tom" in morning drive for a while, before replacing them in 2008 with the Grand Rapids, Michigan-based show "Free Beer And Hot Wings."

2009-present: Country 
On October 7, 2009, KMXN began stunting again, this time with television theme songs. The following day at Noon, the station flipped to country, branded as "92.9 the Bull". The station affiliated with Big D and Bubba for morning drive. The flip makes the station the fourth country station in Topeka, the others being KTOP-FM, WIBW-FM and KTPK.

Ottawa-licensed KOFO (1220 AM) simulcasted on 92.9's HD2 sub-channel from 2011 to 2013.

Current on-air personalities
 Big D and Bubba - The Big D and Bubba Show 5-9A (Mon. thru Sat.)

References

External links
 
 

HD Radio stations
MXN
Country radio stations in the United States
Radio stations established in 1981